Klevi Qefalija (born 12 December 2003) is an Albanian footballer who plays as a central midfielder for Tirana in the Kategoria Superiore.

Honours

Club 
Tirana
Kategoria Superiore: 2021–22
Albanian Supercup: 2022

References

External links

2003 births
Living people
Sportspeople from Tirana
People from Tirana County
People from Tirana
Footballers from Tirana
Albanian footballers
Albania youth international footballers
Association football midfielders
KF Laçi players
Kategoria Superiore players
KF Tirana players